In probability theory, to postselect is to condition a probability space upon the occurrence of a given event.

For a discrete probability space, and thus we require that  be strictly positive in order for the postselection to be well-defined.

See also PostBQP, a complexity class defined with postselection. Using postselection it seems quantum Turing machines are much more powerful: Scott Aaronson proved PostBQP is equal to PP.

Some quantum experiments use post-selection after the experiment as a replacement for communication during the experiment, by post-selecting the communicated value into a constant.

References 

Conditional probability
Theoretical computer science
Quantum complexity theory